Hanno Teuteberg is a retired Rear Admiral in the South African Navy, formerly serving as the Deputy Chief of the Navy.

He joined the South African Navy in 1977 and qualified aboard submarines.

He was defence attaché in Germany from 2003 to 2006 during the delivery of four Valour-class frigates as part of the Arms Deal.

From July 2006 until Dec 2008, he served as Director Fleet Force Preparation, followed by a stint as the Director Maritime Warfare from June 2009 until December 2010 in Pretoria.

From 1 January 2011 until November 2011 he was the Chief of Fleet Staff at Fleet Command in Simon's Town followed by the post of Director Joint Force Preparations and Training with Chief of Joint Operations.

He was promoted to Chief Director Maritime Strategy from 1 February 2013, taking over from his brother Bernhard and promoted to rear admiral.

There was some controversy in the press when he was passed over for appointment to head the Navy, apparently due to his being white. In 2016 it was announced that he was taking voluntary early retirement and was leaving the Navy on 31 March 2016.

Sailing

He is a keen sailor and took Line honours in the 1993 Cape to Rio yacht race. In 1995 he received South African Sailing colours for his part of the South African Admiral's Cup Team.

Honours and awards

 
 
 
 
 
 
 
 
 
 
  Grand Officer Order of Naval Merit (Brazil)

In June 2013 he was awarded the Naval Order of Merit Medal from the Brazilian Navy and in 2015 he was awarded the Argentine Naval Cross for Distinguished Services by the Argentine Navy.

References

South African admirals
Living people
Recipients of the Order of Naval Merit (Brazil)
South African sailors
Year of birth missing (living people)